Maria Zdravkova (born 30 July 1998) is a Bulgarian biathlete. She competed in the 2022 Winter Olympics.

Career
Zdravkova started biathlon in 2010. She debuted at the IBU Cup in 2016 before debuting at the Biathlon World Cup in 2019. She was named as the female flag bearer for Bulgaria at the 2022 Winter Olympics. She competed in multiple biathlon events at the 2022 Winter Olympics. She was part of the Bulgarian team in the mixed relay, placing 19th out of 20 teams. She placed 50th in the individual event, 78th in the sprint, and 18th with the Bulgarian team in the women's relay.

References

1998 births
Living people
Biathletes at the 2022 Winter Olympics
Bulgarian female biathletes
Olympic biathletes of Bulgaria
People from Berkovitsa
Biathletes at the 2016 Winter Youth Olympics